The siemens (symbol: S) is the unit of electric conductance, electric susceptance, and electric admittance in the International System of Units (SI). Conductance, susceptance, and admittance are the reciprocals of resistance, reactance, and impedance respectively; hence one siemens is redundantly equal to the reciprocal of one ohm and is also referred to as the mho. The 14th General Conference on Weights and Measures approved the addition of the siemens as a derived unit in 1971.

The unit is named after Ernst Werner von Siemens. In English, the same word siemens is used both for the singular and plural. Like other SI units named after people, the symbol is capitalized but the name of the unit is not. For the siemens this is particularly important to distinguish it from the second, symbol (lower case) s.

The related property, electrical conductivity, is measured in units of siemens per metre (S/m).

Definition 
For an element conducting direct current, electrical resistance  and electrical conductance  are defined as

The unit siemens for the conductance G is defined by
 

For a device with a conductance of one siemens, the electric current through the device will increase by one ampere for every increase of one volt of electric potential difference across the device.

The conductance of a resistor with a resistance of five ohms, for example, is (5 Ω)−1, which is equal to 200 mS.

Mho 

A historical equivalent for the siemens is the mho. The name is derived from the word ohm spelled backwards as the reciprocal of one ohm, at the suggestion of Sir William Thomson (Lord Kelvin) in 1883. Its symbol is an inverted capital Greek letter omega: .

NIST's Guide for the Use of the International System of Units (SI) refers to the mho as an "unaccepted special name for an SI unit", and indicates that it should be strictly avoided.

The SI term siemens is used universally in science and often in electrical applications, while mho is still used in some electronic contexts.

The inverted capital omega symbol (℧), while not an official SI abbreviation, is less likely to be confused with a variable than the letter 'S' when writing the symbol by hand. The usual typographical distinctions (such as italic for variables and roman for units) are difficult to maintain. Likewise, it is difficult to distinguish the symbol 'S' (siemens) from the lower-case 's' (seconds), potentially causing confusion.

A handwritten 'S' can also be misread as the frequency-space variable 's', commonly used in transfer functions.

The ohm had officially replaced the old "siemens unit", a unit of resistance, at an international conference in 1881.

Notes and references

External links 
 
 

SI derived units
Units of electrical conductance
Werner von Siemens